Killeen–Fort Hood Regional Airport  is a small military/commercial joint-use airport that operates alongside Robert Gray Army Airfield. The airport is based inside the south end of the Fort Hood Military Reservation (known as West Fort Hood), six nautical miles (7 mi, 11 km) southwest of the central business district of Killeen, Texas, in unincorporated Bell County. The commercial side replaced the old Killeen Municipal Airport (now Skylark Field) in August, 2004 as that airport was unable to expand.

As per Federal Aviation Administration records, the airport had 232,299 passenger boardings (enplanements) in calendar year 2008, 231,500 enplanements in 2009, and 243,861 in 2010. It is included in the National Plan of Integrated Airport Systems for 2011–2015, which categorized it as a primary commercial service airport (more than 10,000 enplanements per year).

Facilities and aircraft
The airport has one runway designated 15/33 with a PEM (Porous European Mix) surface measuring 10,000 by 200 feet (3,048 x 61 m). For the 12-month period ending April 10, 2010, the airport had 12,208 aircraft operations, an average of 33 per day: 98.5% scheduled commercial and 1.5% general aviation (military aircraft operations were not included).  For the 12-month period ending August 31, 2015, the airport had 16,318 aircraft operations consisting of 55.9% scheduled commercial, 43.7% military, and 0.37% general aviation.

The civilian terminal has six gates, car rental facilities, and retail shops. Gates 1-3 and 4-6 are separated by different TSA checkpoints.

2018 Master Plan and Improvements
In 2018, the facility continued completion of the master plan, bid and awarded a $4.9 million passenger boarding bridge replacement project, design and bid a $4.7 million security surveillance project, completed design of a $750,000 quick-turn. facility and more. The airport also saw Blimpie take lease of one of the retail spots located on the second floor of the terminal in 2019.

Airlines and destinations
Killeen Regional Airport currently offers a single non-stop destination.

In 2005, Allegiant Air offered twice weekly service to Las Vegas. After nine months of service, Allegient Air stopped all flights to and from Killeen in February 2006.

Occasionally NCAA football teams have their charter airplanes are parked at gates 1 and 6 for away football teams playing the University of Mary Hardin–Baylor, or for the university's own football team. The usual airlines for these charters include Sun Country, Xtra Airways, and Southwest Airlines.

On November 27, 2017, Delta announced that service would no longer continue to Killeen, and the route ended on January 15, 2018. American Airlines later added two daily flights because it no longer had competition with Delta, and it also added the Embraer 175, the largest aircraft for regular scheduled passenger flights currently, and the largest the airport has seen since Allegiant left. United Airlines also added a third daily flight in response to Delta leaving. United has since also left Killeen.

Passenger

Top destinations

See also
 List of airports in Texas

References

External links

 Killeen–Fort Hood Regional Airport, official site
  at Texas DOT Airport Directory
 Aerial image as of February 1995 from USGS The National Map
 
 

Airports in Texas
Fort Hood
Buildings and structures in Bell County, Texas
Transportation in Bell County, Texas
Transportation in Coryell County, Texas